Tentoxin is a natural cyclic tetrapeptide produced by phytopathogenic fungus Alternaria alternata. It selectively induces chlorosis in several germinating seedling plants. Therefore, tentoxin may be used as a potential natural herbicide.

Tentoxin was first isolated from Alternaria alternata (syn. tenuis) and characterized by George Templeton et al. in 1967.

Tentoxin has also been used in recent research to eliminate the polyphenol oxidase (PPO) activity from seedlings of higher plants.

References 

Cyclic peptides
Tetrapeptides